A perpendicular paramagnetic bond is a type of chemical bond (in contrast to covalent or ionic bonds) that does not exist under normal, atmospheric conditions. Such a phenomenon was first hypothesized through simulation to exist in the atmospheres of white dwarf stars whose magnetic fields, on the order of 105 teslas, could allow such interactions to exist. In a very strong magnetic field, excited electrons in molecules may be stabilized, causing these molecules to abandon their original orientations parallel to the magnetic field and instead lie perpendicular to it. Normally, at such intense temperatures as those near a white dwarf, more common molecular bonds cannot form and existing ones decompose.

References 

Astrophysics
Chemical bonding
White dwarfs
Hypothetical processes
Exotic matter
Magnetism in astronomy